The R606 road is a regional road in County Cork, Ireland. It travels from the R605 at Ballythomas Cross south to the R600 at Archdeacon Duggan Bridge near Kinsale. The road's southern section runs along Whitecastle Creek.

References

Regional roads in the Republic of Ireland
Roads in County Cork